Bosco is the stage name of  Constantino (born 11 June 1993), an American drag performer who competed on season 14 of RuPaul's Drag Race in 2022.

Early life
Constantino was raised by musicians in Great Falls, Montana. She received formal dance training at a young age. She was introduced to performative arts training, specifically formal dance training.

Constantino was profiled in the Tribune after being awarded the Dance Educators of America Senior Boy Titlist, ranked at the national competition in Las Vegas, Nevada in 2010. Her tap solo to Frank Sinatra's "Fly Me to the Moon" received the highest award given by the judges.

Career
Constantino's drag name, Bosco, is taken from her deceased dog as a tribute to him, jokingly stating that "He's not using it anymore, he's dead, so now it's mine". Constantino performed in drag for the first time in 2018. Bosco co-hosts a weekly drag show at Queer Bar in Seattle, Washington.

In 2022, she competed on season 14 of RuPaul's Drag Race. She performed a burlesque routine for the opening episode's talent show. In the fifth, ninth, and thirteenth episodes of the season, Bosco won the main challenges, winning three cash prizes of US$5,000.

In episode ten, the Snatch Game, Bosco portrayed Gwenyth Paltrow, was one of the queens to land in the bottom seven, and thus participated in a lip-sync tournament which took place the following episode. She lost two lip syncs, one against Willow Pill to "Never Too Much" by Luther Vandross and one against Lady Camden to "Don't Let Go (Love)" by En Vogue. In the final lip sync, she went up against Jasmine Kennedie to "Swept Away" by Diana Ross, and won.

In the twelfth episode, Bosco landed in the bottom two alongside Jorgeous and had to lip sync to "Heartbreak Hotel (Hex Hector Remix)" by Whitney Houston. She lost the lip sync but was saved after she received the Gold Bar (a twist introduced in the third episode where each queen was assigned a chocolate bar and whoever had a bar which contained a golden ticket wrapped inside would be saved from elimination). This allowed Bosco to stay in the competition. In the subsequent episode, Bosco won the main challenge, which was a roast of Ross Mathews. She eventually made it to the finale, where she ended up in 3rd place.

Personal life
Constantino has lived in Seattle since 2015. Constantino uses she and they pronouns out of drag and she in drag. She came out as a transgender woman in February 2022, having begun her transition after filming Drag Race. In 2023, she underwent facial feminization surgery and debuted her new look while walking in New York Fashion Week.

Season 15 contestant Irene Dubois has been described as a drag "sister" to Bosco.

Awards and nominations

See also
 LGBT culture in Seattle
 List of LGBT people from Seattle

Notes

References

External links

Year of birth missing (living people)
Living people
American drag queens
LGBT people from Montana
LGBT people from Washington (state)
Non-binary drag performers
People from Great Falls, Montana
People from Seattle
RuPaul's Drag Race contestants
Transgender drag performers
Transgender women